The Packard Library is a historic library building located at 301 4th St. in Marysville, California. Built in 1905–06, the library was sponsored by John Q. Packard and designed by San Francisco architect William Curlett. Curlett designed the library in the Italianate and Beaux-Arts styles. The three-story building features verandahs on the east and west sides. The verandahs are supported by rectangular columns, and their roof lines are decorated with acanthus leaves. The library operated until 1977, when it was replaced by the new Yuba County Library.

The library was added to the National Register of Historic Places on December 18, 1978.

References

External links

Buildings and structures in Yuba County, California
Marysville, California
Education in Yuba County, California
Library buildings completed in 1906
Libraries on the National Register of Historic Places in California
Beaux-Arts architecture in California
Italianate architecture in California
National Register of Historic Places in Yuba County, California
1906 establishments in California